Fort McMurray is an urban service area in the Regional Municipality of Wood Buffalo in Alberta, Canada. It is located in northeast Alberta, in the middle of the Athabasca oil sands, surrounded by boreal forest. It has played a significant role in the development of the national petroleum industry. The 2016 Fort McMurray wildfire led to the evacuation of its residents and caused widespread damage.

Formerly a city, Fort McMurray became an urban service area when it amalgamated with Improvement District No. 143 on April 1, 1995, to create the Municipality of Wood Buffalo (renamed the RM of Wood Buffalo on August 14, 1996). Despite its current official designation of urban service area, many locals, politicians and the media still refer to Fort McMurray as a city. Fort McMurray was known simply as McMurray between 1947 and 1962.

History 

Before the arrival of Europeans in the late 18th century, the Cree were the dominant First Nations people in the Fort McMurray area. The Athabasca oil sands were known to the locals and the surface deposits were used to waterproof their canoes. During the fur trade, the location of Fort McMurray, west of Methye Portage, was an important junction on the fur trade route from eastern Canada to the Athabasca Country. In 1778, the first European explorer, Peter Pond, came to the region in search of furs, as the European demand for this commodity at the time was strong. Pond explored the region farther south along the Athabasca River and the Clearwater River, but chose to set up a trading post much farther north by the Athabasca River near Lake Athabasca. However, his post closed in 1788 in favour of Fort Chipewyan, now the oldest continuous settlement in Alberta.

In 1790, the explorer Alexander MacKenzie made the first recorded description of the oil sands.  By that time, trading between the explorers and the Cree was already occurring at the confluence of the Clearwater and Athabasca rivers.  The Hudson's Bay Company and the North West Company were in fierce competition in this region.  Fort McMurray was established there as a Hudson's Bay Company post by 1870, named for the Chief Factor William McMurray. It continued to operate as a transportation stopover in the decades afterwards.  The Alberta and Great Waterways Railway arrived in 1915 complementing existing steamboat service.

The community has played a significant role in the history of the petroleum industry in Canada.  Oil exploration is known to have occurred in the early 20th century, but Fort McMurray's population remained small, no more than a few hundred people. By 1921, there was serious interest in developing a refining plant to separate the oil from the sands. Alcan Oil Company was the first outfit to begin bulk tests at Fort McMurray. The nearby community of Waterways was established to provide a southern terminus for waterborne transportation when the Alberta and Great Waterways Railway reached there in 1921.

Abasands Oil was the first company to successfully extract oil from the oil sands through hot water extraction by the 1930s, but production was very low.  Fort McMurray's processing output gradually grew to over 1,100 barrels/day by World War II, and Fort McMurray was set up by the US and Canadian forces as staging ground for the Canol Project.

Fort McMurray and Waterways amalgamated as the village of McMurray (the "Fort" was dropped until 1962, when it was restored to reflect its heritage) by 1947, and became a town a year later.  Fort McMurray was granted the status of new town so it could get more provincial funding.  By 1966, the town's population was over 2,000.

In 1967, the Great Canadian Oil Sands (now Suncor) plant opened and Fort McMurray's growth soon took off. More oil sands plants were opened, especially after the 1973 oil crisis and the 1979 energy crisis, when serious political tensions and conflicts in the Middle East triggered oil price spikes. The population of the town reached 6,847 by 1971 and climbed to 31,000 by 1981, a year after its incorporation as a city.

The population peaked at almost 37,000 in 1985, then declined to under 34,000 by 1989. Low oil prices since the oil price collapse in 1986 slowed the oil sands production greatly, as oil extraction from the oil sands is a very expensive process and lower world prices made this uneconomical.

On April 1, 1995, the City of Fort McMurray and Improvement District No. 143 were amalgamated to form the Municipality of Wood Buffalo. The new municipality was subsequently renamed the Regional Municipality (RM) of Wood Buffalo on August 14, 1996. As a result, Fort McMurray was no longer officially designated a city. Instead, it was designated an urban service area within a specialized municipality. The amalgamation resulted in the entire RM of Wood Buffalo being under a single government. Its municipal office is located in Fort McMurray, which accounts for the great majority of the RM's population; all but 5,000 of the RM's residents live in the Fort McMurray urban service area.

The city continued to grow for a few years even after the oil bust caused by the 2003 collapse in world oil prices. Oil price increases since 2003 made oil extraction profitable again for around a decade, until another slump in oil prices which began in December 2014 and deepened in 2015 resulted in layoffs and postponement of projects.

In June 2013, heavy rains caused the Hangingstone River to flood, causing a six-day state of emergency, a bridge collapse, the closure of highways 63 and 881, and the evacuation of 150 people.

May 2016 wildfire 

On May 3, 2016, a large wildfire burning southwest of Fort McMurray resulted in the mandatory evacuation of the community.  Record-breaking temperatures, reaching , low relative humidity and strong winds contributed to the fire's rapid growth in forests affected by "an unusually dry and warm winter".

Upwards of 88,000 people in the community and surrounding region were evacuated. It was Canada's largest recorded wildfire evacuation in history and third-largest recorded environmental disaster evacuation behind the 1979 Mississauga train derailment and the 1950 Red River flood.

About one-fifth of homes in the community were reported to be destroyed in the fire.

April 2020 flood 
On April 27, 2020, massive ice jams along the Athabasca River resulted in a major flood. It devastated the downtown of Fort McMurray, submerging streets and ruining businesses, cars and houses.

Approximately 13,000 people from Fort McMurray and the surrounding area were evacuated.

Geography 

Fort McMurray is the largest community in the Regional Municipality of Wood Buffalo.

White spruce, trembling aspen, balsam poplar and white birch are the most prominent native trees in and around town. Black spruce and tamarack occur in poorly drained areas and jack pine may be seen on the driest sites. European aspen, blue spruce and sand cherry are among the exotic trees occasionally seen.

Climate 

The community lies at a lower elevation than most other parts of Alberta, so under the right conditions it can be a "hot spot" for Alberta.

Neighbourhoods 
Neighbourhoods in Fort McMurray include Abasand Heights, Beacon Hill, Eagle Ridge, Grayling Terrace, Gregoire, Lower Townsite, Parsons Creek, Prairie Creek, Saline Creek, Stone Creek, Thickwood Heights, Dickinsfield, Timberlea, and Waterways.

Demographics

Federal census 

In the 2016 census, the Fort McMurray population centre recorded 66,573 residents living in 23,937 of its 28,567 total private dwellings, a  change from its 2011 population of 60,555.

Municipal census 
In addition, the 2021 municipal census counted a shadow population of 3,089 non-permanent residents for a combined population of 76,006, while the 2018 municipal census counted 3,559 non-permanent residents for a combined population of 75,615. As of 2023, the population plateaued at 76,000.

Migration and multiculturalism 
Fort McMurray is an increasingly multicultural community. The 2021 census published by the Regional Municipality of Wood Buffalo found roughly 6,700 people moved to the region since the 2018 census.

The top four provinces that sent people were other communities in Alberta (55 per cent), followed by Newfoundland and Labrador (13 percent), and British Columbia and Ontario (nine percent each).

This is a drastic change from the 2012 municipal census, which was taken when Fort McMurray and the oil sands was undergoing a huge period of economic and population growth. That census reported people from Ontario represented 27.5 percent of Canadians coming to Fort McMurray, followed by British Columbia (26.3 percent) and Newfoundland and Labrador (17.5 percent). People from elsewhere in Alberta made up 3.1 per cent of the population.

The 2021 census found 60.2 percent of residents are white, compared to 64 percent in 2018. The second largest ethnic group is South East Asian (7.2 percent), followed by South Asian (6.7 percent). People identifying as Chinese, Japanese or Korean represented 2.08 percent of the population.

Indigenous peoples represented 7 percent, remaining consistent from 2018. The municipal survey did not count the population of the region's First Nation reserves because they do not fall under municipal jurisdiction. First Nations people represent four percent of the municipality's population. Métis people represent 2.89 percent of the population, followed by Inuk (0.16 percent) and non-Status First Nation (0.13 percent).

About 3.2 percent of people identified as African, followed by mixed ethnicities (2.44 percent), Black or African Canadian (2 percent), European (1.73 percent), Arab (1.41 percent), Hispanic or Latin American (1.08 percent), Caribbean (0.67 percent) and Oceanic (0.13 percent).

2.88 percent of respondents did not answer and 0.52 said they did not know their ethnicity.

Economy 
Fort McMurray is considered the heart of one of Alberta's (and Canada's) hubs of petroleum production, located near the Athabasca oil sands. Besides the oil sands, the economy also relies on natural gas and pipeline transport, forestry and tourism. Oil sands producers include Syncrude, Suncor Energy, Canadian Natural Resources, and CNOOC Petroleum North America ULC. Fort McMurray's growth is characteristic of a boomtown. Housing prices and rents are far higher in Fort McMurray than most such remote areas, and in 2006, Fort McMurray had the highest prices in Alberta. The Alberta government has promised to release more Crown land for residential construction, particularly in Timberlea on the north side.

Infrastructure

Air

There are several airports in the area, with Fort McMurray International Airport being the largest in northern Alberta. It is serviced by Air Canada, Air Canada Express, McMurray Aviation, Northwestern Air, WestJet and WestJet Encore, with scheduled flights to Calgary, Edmonton, Fort Chipewyan, Fort Smith, and Toronto. The airport is also serviced by various oil companies with corporate and charter flights heading north to private airstrips at oil sands operations. Flights are frequently booked to capacity because of the high transient worker population and workers who commute to Fort McMurray from other parts of Canada.

Public transit
Fort McMurray Transit operates in the community, with routes that extend to all subdivisions on the south side and subdivisions on the north side. Although the service concentrates on Fort McMurray it does operate to hamlets in the RM including Anzac, Janvier, Conklin and Fort McKay.

Bus
Ebus and Red Arrow operate scheduled passenger bus services to Edmonton and other communities along Highway 63, as well as other destinations farther south.

Highways and roads
Highway 63 is the only highway between Fort McMurray and Edmonton. Due to the industrial demands of the oilsands, Highway 63 boasts some of the highest tonnage per kilometre in Canada, and the largest and heaviest loads that trucks have ever carried. Highway 63 was fully twinned in May 2016. Highway 881 also provides access to the region from Lac La Biche.

Rail
Canadian National Railway (CN) discontinued the Muskeg Mixed (mixed train) to Fort McMurray in 1989, and there has been no passenger rail service since. CN continues to operate freight service on its Lac La Biche subdivision and stations beyond.

Mail
Canada Post identified Fort McMurray as "having a particularly high cost to serve" in January 2014, and planned to institute a surcharge of $5.00 for all parcels shipped to the area. However, the postal service retracted this decision before the rate change went into effect.

Education 

The Fort McMurray Public School District (FMPSD) and Catholic School District both serve the primary, elementary, and secondary education needs of students in Fort McMurray. Each school district offers diverse programs like French immersion, performing arts or a dedicated technology and science lab, however only FMPSD offers the Advanced Placement program at one of their schools, being Westwood Community High School.

On Abasand Drive, École Boréal is the only francophone school in the area and goes from pre-kindergarten to grade 12.

Keyano College is a publicly funded college and vocational institute based in the area and plays a role in training workers for the oil sands. Known as the cultural hub of the Regional Municipality of Wood Buffalo, Keyano College contains both a state-of-the-art theatre and recital hall, hosting a variety of musical and theatrical events that attract upwards of 50,000 visitors each season.

Sports and recreation 

Local teams include the Fort McMurray Oil Barons of the Alberta Junior Hockey League (AJHL), the Fort McMurray Giants of the Western Canadian Baseball League (WCBL), and the Keyano Huskies of the Alberta Colleges Athletics Conference (ACAC).

The MacDonald Island Park recreation centre is located on MacDonald Island north-east of downtown. The centre contains the Wood Buffalo Regional Library, indoor water park, basketball, tennis and squash courts, rock climbing, fitness centre, indoor playground, ice rinks and public rental space. Shell Place, a connected recreational facility, and a seasonal golf course surround the centre. Fort McMurray Knights Rugby Football Club is also based in the town.

Notable people
Mark Hartigan, played in the NHL for the Anaheim Ducks, Atlanta Thrashers, Columbus Blue Jackets, and Detroit Red Wings

See also 
List of former urban municipalities in Alberta
Media in Fort McMurray
Petrolia, Ontario, Canada's first oil town
Shell Place

Notes

References

External links 

 
 Regional Municipality of Wood Buffalo

 
1947 establishments in Alberta
Cities in Alberta
Former new towns in Alberta
Hudson's Bay Company forts
Mining communities in Alberta
Populated places disestablished in 1995
Populated places established in 1870
Regional Municipality of Wood Buffalo
Urban service areas in Alberta
1870 establishments in the British Empire